The Constitutions of the Carmelite Order stand as an expression of the ideals and spirit of the Order of Our Lady of Mount Carmel.  Foundational sources for the Constitutions include the desert hermit vocation as exemplified in the life of the Prophet Elijah. For the Carmelite the contemplative vocation is exemplified par excellence in the life of the Virgin Mary, beloved to the Order under the title of Our Lady of Mount Carmel. Additionally, the Carmelite Rule of St. Albert and the Book of the First Monks comprise fundamental points of reference in the life and spirituality of the Order.

Between the 13th and 16th centuries the Order lost much of its vigour. The reform led by Teresa of Ávila and John of the Cross restored Carmelite life with a new joy and asceticism. The Discalced Carmelite renewal saw the Constitutions reaffirmed and strengthened.  They were again revitalised under the directives of the Second Vatican Council.

 Two different approved texts of Constitutions exist today for the Discalced Carmelite Nuns: those approved by Pope John Paul II December 8, 1990, and those approved by Pope John Paul II September 17, 1991. The Carmels under the 1990 Constitutions, many of which are in Spain, are generally more traditional and fall under the direct jurisdiction of the Holy See. Under the 1991 Constitutions, the nuns are associated with the Carmelite friars and fall under the jurisdiction of the Discalced Carmelite Father General.

See also 
Carmelite Rule of St. Albert
Book of the First Monks
Carmelite Rite

External links
 Carmelite Constitutions 1990 in its original language -Spanish
 Carmelite Constitutions 1995. (Full-text, English language PDF of the Constitutions from the Irish Province of the Order of Carmelites (O.Carm.)).
 Carmelite Constitutions 1995. Trans. Elena French. Faversham, UK: AGA Printer & Sons, 1996. Curia Generalizia dei Carmelitani. Via Giovanni Lanza 138, 00184 Rome, Italy. (Full-text, English language web version of the Constitutions approved by the Order's Prior General and his Council).
 Discalced Carmelite Calendar and Saints
 Index of Carmelite Websites
 "Sayings of Light and Love" — Spiritual Maxims of John of the Cross

Carmelite spirituality
Christian monasticism